Kevin Darley (born 5 August 1960, in Penn, Wolverhampton) is a retired jockey, and a co-president of the Jockeys' Association of Great Britain. He was British flat racing Champion Apprentice in 1978 with 70 wins and Champion Jockey in 2000 with 155 wins. He also won the Lester Award for Flat Jockey of the Year in 2000, and won the Lester Special Recognition Award in 1997 and 2007.

He was associated with a number of trainers including Mark Johnston, for whom he won the English 1,000 Guineas, Irish 1,000 Guineas, Coronation Stakes and Sun Chariot Stakes on Attraction. He also won the St Leger on Bollin Eric and French Derby on Celtic Swing.

Married with two daughters, he retired as a jockey in November 2007, after a disappointing year blighted by niggling injuries.

Statistics

Flat wins in Great Britain by year, from 1988

Major wins
 Great Britain
 1,000 Guineas - (1) - Attraction (2004)
 Coronation Stakes - (1) - Attraction (2004)
 Dewhurst Stakes - (1) - Shamardal (2004)
 Golden Jubilee Stakes - (1) - Malhub (2002)
 Haydock Sprint Cup - (2) - Pipalong (2000), Reverence (2006)
 Nunthorpe Stakes - (2) - Coastal Bluff (1997, dead heat), Reverence (2006)
 Queen Elizabeth II Stakes - (2) - Observatory (2000), Where or When (2002)
 Racing Post Trophy - (3) - Celtic Swing (1994), High Chaparral (2001), Brian Boru (2002)
 St. Leger - (1) - Bollin Eric (2002)
 Sun Chariot Stakes - (4) - La Confederation (1994), Warning Shadows (1995), Attraction (2004), Peeress (2005)
 Yorkshire Oaks - (1) - Super Tassa (2001)

 Canada
 E. P. Taylor Stakes - (1) - Fraulein (2002)

 France
 Prix du Jockey Club - (1) - Celtic Swing (1995)
 Prix de l'Opéra - (1) - Kinnaird (2005)

 Germany
 Aral-Pokal - (1) - River North (1994)
 Deutsches Derby - (1) - Belenus (1999)

 Ireland
 Irish 1,000 Guineas - (1) - Attraction (2004)
 Matron Stakes - (1) - Attraction (2005)
 Moyglare Stud Stakes - (1) - Bianca Nera (1996)

 Italy
 Premio Presidente della Repubblica - (1) - Flagbird (1995)
 Premio Vittorio di Capua - (1) - Port Lucaya (1994)

External links
Biography Jockeysroom.com
Profile National Thoroughbred Racing Association
Kevin Darley BBC Sport

References

English jockeys
Lester Award winners
1960 births
Sportspeople from Wolverhampton
Living people
British Champion flat jockeys
British Champion apprentice jockeys
